Prince Ferdinando, Duke of Genoa may refer to:
 Prince Ferdinando, Duke of Genoa (1822–1855)
 Prince Ferdinando, Duke of Genoa (1884–1963)